Mindif is an album by Abdullah Ibrahim. It was performed and recorded for the soundtrack of the film Chocolat.

Reception

The AllMusic reviewer concluded that "the overall results, while pleasant, are not as essential as Ibrahim's best work". The Penguin Guide to Jazz wrote that "Powell and Handy are both exciting players and Higgins's drumming is so imaginative as often to become the focus of a piece".

Track listing 
 "Earth Bird" - 3:03
 "African Market" - 8:17
 "Mindif" - 6:46
 "Pule (Rain)" - 4:52
 "Protée" - 4:35
 "Star Dance" - 4:59
 "Theme For Mark" - 3:26
 "Serenity (The Daybreak Song)" - 3:08

Source:

Personnel 
 Abdullah Ibrahim – piano, flute, voice
 Craig Handy – tenor saxophone, flute
 Ricky Ford – soprano & tenor saxophone
 Benny Powell – trombone
 David Williams – bass
 Billy Higgins – drums

Sources:

References 

1988 albums
Abdullah Ibrahim albums
Enja Records albums